Morehouse Lake is a lake that is located in Hamilton County in New York.

References

Lakes of New York (state)
Lakes of Hamilton County, New York